Alexandra Schimmer is vice president, General Counsel and Secretary of the board of trustees for Denison University. She is the former Solicitor General of Ohio.

Early life and education

Schimmer earned her Bachelor of Arts summa cum laude from Princeton University in 1998, also studying Arabic and Islamic history, a Fulbright Fellow to England earning a Master of Philosophy from Cambridge University in 1999 and her JD from Yale Law School in 2002. At Yale Law School, she was a Coker Fellow Yale Law Journal, Senior Editor, 2001, 2002 Yale Journal of International Law and Editor in 2000 and 2001.

Career

Schimmer became a litigator and appellate lawyer with the Vorys law firm in Columbus, Ohio.

Schimmer was appointed by the governor of Ohio to serve as Ohio Commissioner to the national Uniform Law Commission. During her nine years volunteering on the commission, she worked on criminal justice reform including the Uniform Collateral Consequences of Conviction Act which worked to address and relieve undue barriers to successful reentry after involvements with the criminal justice system.

Schimmer served as the Deputy General Counsel for The Ohio State University. Schimmer served as the Chief Deputy Solicitor General and then Solicitor General for the State of Ohio.

On August 19, 2019, Schimmer joined Denison University where she served as vice president, General Counsel and Secretary of the board of trustees.

On April 19, 2022, it was reported that the  White House has been vetting two women lawyers, Schimmer and Rachel Bloomekatz for a vacancy on the United States Court of Appeals for the Sixth Circuit.

Notable cases 

On October 9, 2012, Schimmer made her first argument at the Supreme Court of the United States in Tibbals v. Carter. The case involved whether death-sentenced prisoners have a right to competence in federal habeas proceedings and whether federal courts may grant indefinite stays of those proceedings when a prisoner is incompetent.

References

Living people
Year of birth missing (living people)
Solicitors General of Ohio
Princeton University alumni
Fulbright alumni
Alumni of the University of Cambridge
Yale Law School alumni
Denison University people